Hannah Ann Sluss (born April 25, 1996)  is an American television personality who came to national prominence in 2020, as the winner of season 24 of The Bachelor, starring Peter Weber.

Early life and education 
Sluss was born in Knoxville, Tennessee to parents Jennifer and Rick. She has a sister Haley, and a brother Wade. She attended Pellissippi State Community College.

Career 
Sluss has modeled for most of her life in multiple ads. She also competed in pageants. For the Miss Tennessee, she was the first runner-up in 2015 and 2018, came in fourth place in 2017, and was the second runner-up in 2014. She was also Miss North Knoxville.

In 2019, she was cast in season 24 of The Bachelor, starring pilot Peter Weber. Filming took place in the fall of 2019. She was officially announced as a contestant on December 16, 2019. She was the winner of the season and got engaged to Weber on the finale. On After the Final Rose, it was revealed Weber called off their engagement because he was still in love with runner-up Madison Prewett. She appeared on The Ellen DeGeneres Show after the season ended.

She appeared on The Ultimate Surfer in September 2021 along with Mike Johnson. She got surf lessons from the contestants and got to choose who gets to move on.

Personal life 
Sluss began dating Indianapolis Colts running back Jake Funk in November 2021. They announced their engagement on January 25, 2023.

Filmography

Television

Music videos

Awards and nominations

References

External links

1996 births
Living people
Bachelor Nation contestants
Reality show winners